Justicia is the eleventh studio album by American pianist Eddie Palmieri. It was released by Tico Records in 1969. It is Palmieri's most overtly political album, with lyrics dealing with inequality, discrimination and social justice. Described as an "integrated discourse", i.e. a concept album, it combines the popular salsa dura style of the 1970s on side A with a more innovative approach to jazz experimentation on side B.

Background and recording
Throughout the 1960s, pianist Eddie Palmieri played an important role in the development of salsa with his conjunto La Perfecta. La Perfecta was one of the first Latin ensembles to feature multiple trombones, one of salsa's distinctive characteristics. The band's repertoire was inspired by Cuban and Puerto Rican dance-oriented styles such as guaracha, son, pachanga and bomba. In 1968, Palmieri disbanded La Perfecta in order to seek a more experimental approach incorporating funk and soul elements into his music. Palmieri and his new ensemble (still similar to La Perfecta, with Barry Rogers being replaced by Lewis Kahn) recorded a series of four albums for Tico that have been said to contain his "best sounding" work. These four albums were Champagne (1968), Justicia (1969), Superimposition (1970) and Vámonos Pa'l Monte (1971).

The album was recorded at Incredible Sounds studio in New York during the winter season. According to Palmieri, it was so cold he had to wear gloves during the recording sessions.

Lyrics and composition
In Justicia, Palmieri demonstrates the two main traits of his music during the era, namely "a grounding in social issues" at the lyrical level, and "a continuous, insistent experimentation" at the musical level. The social aspect of the album is patent on the title track, which opens the album and has been said to "epitomize the salsa style". Although uncredited, its lyrics were written by lead singer Ismael Quintana. Musically, it has been described as "a composition in which the guaracha predominates within a multiform and polyrhythmic salsa", and its lyrics call for justice for "boricuas" (Puerto Ricans) and "niche" (African-Americans). This social theme would be continued in Palmieri's performance at Sing Sing Prison (particularly the recitations), as well as the opener of Vámonos pa'l monte, titled "Revolt / La libertad, lógico". Together with the title track, side A contains the more Latin-based pieces of the album, such as Rafael Hernández's bolero "Amor ciego" and Ignacio Piñeiro's son-rumba "Lindo yambú". The folkloric-sounding "My Spiritual Indian" contains a trumpet solo by Alfredo "Chocolate" Armenteros.

Palmieri's experimental approach to Latin jazz is mostly contained on side B of the album. "Everything Is Everything" is based on a standard blues form, with strong North American influences and a rhythm section similar to that of the soul jazz groups of the 1960s. "Verdict on Judge Street" is an extended jazz waltz, with long instrumental solos and few Latin elements. Nonetheless, on piano, Palmieri reserved his left hand for guajeos (vamping) throughout the track, while his right hand played jazz chords, creating an ambiguous contrast. The practice of including Cuban music on side A and experimental/jazz music on side B would be continued on Superimposition.

Release
The album was released by Tico Records in 1969. During the recording sessions, ownership of Tico Records passed from Morris Levy to George Goldner; only the latter was credited as producer. Fania Records, which later acquired the Tico Records catalogue, re-issued the album on CD in 2006.

Artwork
The album cover was designed by visual artist Ely Besalel, who had worked on many previous Latin and jazz albums for Roulette Records and Tico Records. The cover displays the album title in a "stark, bold typography" that has been said to represent "a timeless cry for justice". In the top left corner, a small picture of Palmieri sitting on the floor, "thinking, worrying", further reinforces the message of the album. The photograph was taken by Warren Flagler. Besalel, who had already worked with Palmieri, would go on to develop a longer lasting relationship with him, working on Superimposition, Vámonos pa'l monte and Unifinished Masterpiece.

Reception and legacy

On his book Latin Jazz, John Storm Roberts wrote a favourable review of Justicia, calling it "the beginning of a number of extraordinarily important Palmieri releases". Tony Wilds wrote a mixed review for AllMusic, describing the album as "interesting" but "only average for an Eddie Palmieri record, which is still heads above most, and probably essential listening".

After its release, Justicia has a long-lasting impact on the thriving New York salsa scene, with numerous socially-conscious bands arising shortly after its release. Notable examples include Tony Pabón's La Protesta and Manny Oquendo's Conjunto Libre. Oquendo had been a long-time member of Palmieri's band, playing in most of his albums, including Justicia.

Track listing

Personnel
According to original album sleeve.

Eddie Palmieri & His Orchestra
Eddie Palmieri – piano
Ismael Quintana – vocals
Arturo Campa – chorus
Justo Betancourt – chorus
Carlos "Caíto" Díaz – chorus
Elliot Romero – chorus
Jimy Sabater – chorus
Lewis Kahn – trombone
José Rodrigues – trombone
Julian Priester – trombone (track B3)
Mark Weinstein – trombone (track B3)
Alfredo "Chocolate" Armenteros – trumpet
Nicky Marrero – percussion, timbales
Bob Bianco – guitar, vocals (track B4)
David Herscher – bass
Lawrence Evans – bass (track B3)
Robert Thomas – drums (track B3)
Francisco Aguabella – congas
Chino Pozo – congas, bongos
Ray Romero – congas, bongos
Manny Oquendo – bongos
Roberto Franquiz – claves

Technical
George Goldner – producer
Frank E. Dahm – engineer
Art Kapper – technical consultant

References

1969 albums
Eddie Palmieri albums
Tico Records albums
Descarga albums